Cabarita is a small suburb of Mildura, Victoria, Australia, located approximately 10 km from the CBD. At the 2016 census, Cabarita had a population of 488.

The Post Office opened on 1 July 1925 and was known for some months as Lake Hawthorn before being renamed Cabarita.

References

Towns in Victoria (Australia)
Mallee (Victoria)